Muppet RaceMania is a PlayStation racing game that was developed by Traveller's Tales and released in 2000. The game includes the choice of 25 muppet characters driving 25 vehicles.  They race on 34 tracks based on locations in Muppet films and TV programs.

This game marked the first vocal appearance by Janice since the death of Richard Hunt in 1992. She and Scooter were performed by Matt Vogel, the only time when he voiced these characters. It is also the first vocal appearance of Link Hogthrob since the death of Jim Henson in 1990, as performed by Steve Whitmire, as well as the final time Frank Oz voiced all of his characters before retiring from The Muppets.

Reception

The game received average reviews according to the review aggregation website GameRankings. Three reviewers of GameFan gave it scores of 84, 54, and 50. However, Eric Bratcher of Next Generation called it "A substandard kart racer that unsuccessfully relies upon the Muppets' huge charisma to overcome its technical shortcomings."

References

External links
 
 

2000 video games
Midway video games
Racing video games
Kart racing video games
The Muppets video games
Traveller's Tales games
Vehicular combat games
PlayStation (console) games
PlayStation (console)-only games
Sony Interactive Entertainment games
Video games about amphibians
Video games about pigs
Video games about bears
Video games about dogs
Video games scored by Andy Blythe and Marten Joustra
Video games developed in the United Kingdom
Multiplayer and single-player video games